The 2017 Asian Rowing Championships were the 18th Asian Rowing Championships and took place from 4 to 8 September 2017 in Klong Phai Water Sport Training Centre, Pattaya, Thailand.

Medal summary

Men

Women

Medal table

References

External links
Asian Rowing Fedeation

Rowing Championships
Asian
Asian Rowing Championships
Asian
September 2017 sports events in Thailand